The Parish of Currawang is a parish of Argyle County located to the north of Lake George. The parish was formerly known as the parish of Currowang, the former name discontinued on 14 November 1980 and the present name assigned.

The parish is roughly equivalent to the locality of Currawang.

Images

Notable residents
 Tom Frame (bishop)

References
New South Wales Parish maps preservation project

Parishes of Argyle County